Suisei is Japanese for "comet" and the Japanese name for the planet Mercury. It may also stand for:
Hoshimachi Suisei, Japanese virtual YouTuber
 Suisei (probe), a Japanese space probe to Halley's Comet
 Yokosuka D4Y Suisei, a Japanese dive bomber